Scopula pallida is a moth of the  family Geometridae. It is found in India.

References

Moths described in 1888
pallida
Moths of Asia